Eugene Hoffman Nickerson (August 2, 1918 – January 1, 2002) was the Democratic county executive of Nassau County, New York, from 1962 until 1970. Nickerson was the only Democrat to be elected county executive in Nassau County until 2001. Later, as a United States district judge of the United States District Court for the Eastern District of New York, he presided over a challenge to the Pentagon's "Don't ask, don't tell" policy on homosexuality and the notorious Abner Louima police brutality case in New York.

Nickerson was nominated by President Jimmy Carter on August 16, 1977, to a seat vacated by Orrin Judd. He was confirmed by the United States Senate on October 20, 1977, and received commission on October 21, 1977. Assumed senior status on January 1, 1994. Nickerson's service was terminated on January 1, 2002, due to death.

Early life and education 

Nickerson was a descendant both of the Nickerson family of Cape Cod, Massachusetts, and of President John Quincy Adams. His mother, né Ruth Constance Comstock (1891–1988), was from Orange, New Jersey. She gave birth to three sons: Schuyler, Eugene and Adams. His father, Hoffman Nickerson (1888–1965), was an Army officer, state legislator, and historian who wrote The turning point of the Revolution; or, Burgoyne in America concerning the Saratoga campaign.

Born in Orange, New Jersey, Nickerson grew up in New York City and Mill Neck on Long Island. At St. Mark's School in Southborough, Massachusetts, he was quarterback of the football team and captain of the hockey team. But shortly before he entered Harvard College in 1937, Nickerson was stricken by polio, seemingly ending what had started out to be a promising athletic career. For two years, he was forced to wear his right arm in a brace held out from his body. While at Harvard, Nickerson showed unusual perseverance by teaching himself to play squash with his left hand. Ultimately he was named the squash team's captain and its ranking player. Harvard's athletic director, William Bingham, wrote to another Harvard graduate, President Franklin D. Roosevelt, about the courage of this young squash player. President Roosevelt answered Bingham's letter saying "What we need are more Nickersons." Bingham sent a copy of the President's letter to Eugene's father, Hoffman Nickerson. The letter was kept in a box for years until Eugene's wife, Marie-Louise, took it out to read to their daughters. He graduated from Harvard with a Bachelor of Arts degree. In 1943, he graduated from Columbia Law School with a Bachelor of Laws, where he was an editor of the Columbia Law Review. Following graduation, he clerked for Judge Augustus Noble Hand of the United States Court of Appeals for the Second Circuit, and then for Chief Justice Harlan Fiske Stone of the United States Supreme Court from October 1944 to April 1946.

Professional career and government service 

He worked for Wall Street law firm Milbank, Tweed, Hope, Hadley & McCloy, then Hale, Stimson, Russell & Nickerson. From 1970 until his appointment to the bench in October 1977, Nickerson was a name partner and litigator with the firm Nickerson, Kramer, Lowenstein, Nessen, Kamin & Soll, now known as Kramer Levin Naftalis & Frankel. Entering politics, he became the first Democrat to win a countywide seat in Nassau County, New York since 1912, when regular Republicans and the Progressive (Bull Moose) Party split the Republican vote. In his three three-year terms as county executive, Nickerson took a more liberal approach than his Republican predecessors, often working to expand social services for the needy in what was then one of the nation's fastest-growing counties. He was an early advocate of environmental protection, expanded Nassau County's park system, recruited college graduates for the police force, and favored progressive zoning regulations to open up housing opportunities to minorities and the poor.

He later described his years in the post as reorienting "government to concern itself with human beings and their problems." Pressed by Robert F. Kennedy, who recognized Nickerson's political talents, he ran for the United States Senate in 1968 but lost in the Democratic primary.

Nickerson was occasionally seen as an unusual member of the Democratic Party. Referring to the man who was the Democratic presidential nominee in 1952 and 1956, Nickerson once explained, "Adlai Stevenson turned me into a Democrat. I was active in his first campaign, and I stayed active. He brought in other people like myself who had intense interests about government, of ideals and principles."

Federal judicial service 

Nickerson was nominated by President Jimmy Carter on August 16, 1977, to a seat on the United States District Court for the Eastern District of New York vacated by Judge Orrin Grimmell Judd. He was confirmed by the United States Senate on October 20, 1977, and received his commission on October 21, 1977. He assumed senior status on January 1, 1994. His service was terminated on January 1, 2002, due to his death.

Failed nomination to the Second Circuit 

On August 26, 1980, President Jimmy Carter nominated Nickerson to a seat on the United States Court of Appeals for the Second Circuit to replace Judge Murray Gurfein, who had died in 1979. However, given that the nomination occurred after the unofficial Thurmond Rule governing judicial nominations during presidential election years, the Senate never took up Nickerson's nomination. President Ronald Reagan chose instead to nominate Lawrence W. Pierce to the seat in September 1981. Pierce was confirmed by the United States Senate in November 1981.

Death 

Nickerson died January 1, 2002, in New York City aged 83, following complications after stomach surgery.

See also 
 Jimmy Carter judicial appointment controversies
 List of law clerks of the Supreme Court of the United States (Chief Justice)

References

External links 
 New York Times Obituary
 Harvard University memorial page (archived)
Eugene H. Nickerson papers, 1955–1970, Rare Book & Manuscript Library, Columbia University Libraries

1918 births
2002 deaths
Harvard University alumni
Columbia Law School alumni
Judges of the United States District Court for the Eastern District of New York
Law clerks of the Supreme Court of the United States
Law clerks of Harlan F. Stone
Nassau County Executives
New York (state) Democrats
People from Orange, New Jersey
St. Mark's School (Massachusetts) alumni
United States district court judges appointed by Jimmy Carter
20th-century American judges